Markandu Nadarajah is a Sri Lankan Tamil politician and provincial councillor.

Nadarajah contested the 2012 provincial council election as one of the Tamil National Alliance's candidates in Batticaloa District and was elected to the Eastern Provincial Council (EPC). A few days after the election some TNA councillors including Nadarajah were threatened and coerced into joining the United People's Freedom Alliance but none of them gave into the threats. Nadarajah and the other newly elected TNA provincial councillors took their oaths on 28 September 2012 in front of TNA leader and Member of Parliament R. Sampanthan.

References

Illankai Tamil Arasu Kachchi politicians
Living people
Members of the Eastern Provincial Council
People from Eastern Province, Sri Lanka
Sri Lankan Tamil politicians
Tamil National Alliance politicians
Year of birth missing (living people)